Senthil Nagar is a residential area located between Avadi and Ambattur railway stations in the city of Chennai comes under Chennai district. It is a developing township mainly focused on housing units. Valampuri Vinayagar Temple, Thirumullaivoyil Railway Station, Rangaswamy Matriculation School, Tiny Tot Kids School, Anna Auditorium and Kalaimagal Matriculation School are the main reference points for this small residential township, also is the famous "banyan tree" (Aala maram).

Thirumullaivoyal railway station is the nearest railway station for senthil nagar and is located about 500 meters from the Mahathma Gandhi Main road,( senthil nagar ). The railway station connects local areas like Chennai central station, Madras beach station, Arakkonam and Tiruvallur.

By road it is nearly 22 km from Chennai central station, 4 km from Chennai bye pass and 24 km from Chennai domestic airport. Ambattur O.T is nearly about 2.5 km and 2.2 km to Thirumullaivoyil from senthil nagar respectively. Chennai bye pass located about 4 km from senthil nagar which connects way to NH4( Bangalore Highway), G.S.T road, Kolkata Highway.

It is really an improving area and it is active since 1970, but for the past  few years, development is fast with many facilities like public transit system, medical clinics, commercial complexes, schools, college, auditorium, bus stand, play ground, etc... Bus routes connecting Senthil nagar via Thirumullaivoyil are M147S ( to T.Nagar), 41D ext.( to Mandaveli) and 71F to C.M.B.T via Ambattur, also train routes available to most parts of the city and its outskirts.

It comes under Ward 11 of Avadi Municipality. The ward councilor is Mr. C. Gopalakirshnan.
Address of the councilor: No 8, Anna Street, Senthil Nagar, Thirumullaivoyal, Chennai-600 062.
Official Link : https://www.facebook.com/pages/Thirumullaivoyil-Senthil-Nagar/124135344305375

Neighbourhoods in Chennai